Concord Village Historic District may refer to:

Concord Village Historic District (Concord, Michigan), listed on the NRHP in Michigan
Concord Village Historic District (Concord, Tennessee), listed on the NRHP in Tennessee